The Andover Regional School District is a regional public school district in Sussex County, New Jersey, United States, serving students in pre-kindergarten through eighth grade comprising the communities of Andover Borough and Andover Township.

As of the 2017-18 school year, the district and its two schools had an enrollment of 470 students and 47.9 classroom teachers (on an FTE basis), for a student–teacher ratio of 9.8:1.

The district is classified by the New Jersey Department of Education as being in District Factor Group "FG", the fourth-highest of eight groupings. District Factor Groups organize districts statewide to allow comparison by common socioeconomic characteristics of the local districts. From lowest socioeconomic status to highest, the categories are A, B, CD, DE, FG, GH, I and J.

Public school students in ninth through twelfth grades from both Andover Borough and Andover Township attend Newton High School in Newton, together with students from Green Township, as part of a sending/receiving relationship with the Newton Public School District. As of the 2017-18 school year, the high school had an enrollment of 719 students and 67.5 classroom teachers (on an FTE basis), for a student–teacher ratio of 10.6:1.

Schools 
Schools in the district (with 2017-18 enrollment data from the National Center for Education Statistics) are:
Florence M. Burd Elementary School (220 students in grades PreK-4)
Cindy Mizelle, Principal
Long Pond Middle School (244 students in grades 5-8)
Bryan J. Fleming, Principal

Administration
Core members of the district's administration are:
Dennis Tobin, Interim Superintendent of Schools  
Nicole Sylvester, Business Administrator / Board Secretary

The district's board of education has nine members who set policy and oversee the fiscal and educational operation of the district through its administration. As a Type II school district, the board's trustees are elected directly by voters of the constituent municipalities to serve three-year terms of office on a staggered basis, with three seats up for election each year held (since 2012) as part of the November general election. Seats on the board are allocated based on population, with Andover Township assigned eight seats and Andover Borough assigned one seat.

References

External links 
Andover Regional School District

Andover Regional School District, National Center for Education Statistics
Newton High School

Andover, New Jersey
Andover Township, New Jersey
New Jersey District Factor Group FG
School districts in Sussex County, New Jersey